Reprogrammable memory (abbreviated as REPROM or RePROM) is type of ROM, more precisely, a type of PROM electronic memory. Re refers to reprogrammable ROM memory.
There are two types of RePROM electronic memories:

 EPROM
 E²PROM or EEPROM

See also
 Read-mostly memory (RMM)

Non-volatile memory
Computer memory